The Australasian Performing Right Association Awards of 2013 (generally known as APRA Awards) are a series of related awards which include the APRA Music Awards, Art Music Awards, and Screen Music Awards. The APRA Music Awards of 2013 was the 31st annual ceremony by the Australasian Performing Right Association (APRA) and the Australasian Mechanical Copyright Owners Society (AMCOS) to award outstanding achievements in contemporary songwriting, composing and publishing. The ceremony was held on 17 June 2013 at the Melbourne Convention and Exhibition Centre.

The Art Music Awards were distributed on 26 August at the NIDA Parade Theatre, Sydney. They are sponsored by APRA and the Australian Music Centre (AMC) to "recognise achievement in the composition, performance, education and presentation of Australian music". The Screen Music Awards were issued on 9 December by APRA and Australian Guild of Screen Composers (AGSC), which "acknowledges excellence and innovation in the genre of screen composition".

On 23 May nominations for the APRA Music Awards were announced on multiple news sources, with Matthew Calwell aka 360 being the most nominated artist. Hosts for the 2013 APRA Music Awards were Clare Bowditch and Jonathan Biggins. A total of 14 awards were presented. The Seekers were honoured with the Ted Albert Award for Outstanding Services to Australian Music. Gotye (aka Wally de Backer), Tame Impala and Sia were described by the Australian Recording Industry Association as "big winners". The APRA Music Awards ceremony highlights were broadcast on the MAX network on 26 June 2013.

Presenters

At the APRA Music Awards, aside from the hosts, Clare Bowditch and Jonathan Biggins, the presenters were Gotye, Jenny Morris, Bert Newton and Michael Gudinski.

Performances

The APRA Music Awards ceremony showcased performances by:
 Architecture in Helsinki
 Jessica Mauboy
 British India
 Ball Park Music

APRA Music Awards

Blues & Roots Work of the Year

Breakthrough Songwriter of the Year

Country Work of the Year

Dance Work of the Year

International Work of the Year

Most Played Australian Work

Most Played Australia Work Overseas

Rock Work of the Year

Song of the Year

Urban Work of the Year

Songwriter of the Year

Sia

Ted Albert Award for Outstanding Services to Australian Music

The Seekers

Art Music Awards

Work of the Year – Instrumental

Work of the Year – Jazz

Work of the Year – Orchestral

Work of the Year – Vocal or Choral

Performance of the Year

Award for Excellence by an Individual

Award for Excellence by an Organisation

Award for Excellence in Music Education

Award for Excellence in a Regional Area

Award for Excellence in Experimental Music

Award for Excellence in Jazz

Distinguished Services to Australian Music

Screen Music Awards

International Achievement Award

Feature Film Score of the Year

Best Music for an Advertisement

Best Music for Children's Television

Best Music for a Documentary

Best Music for a Mini-Series or Telemovie

Best Music for a Short Film

Best Music for a Television Series or Serial

Best Original Song Composed for the Screen

Best Soundtrack Album

Best Television Theme

Most Performed Screen Composer – Australia

Most Performed Screen Composer – Overseas

References

2013 in Australian music
2013 music awards
APRA Awards